Frances Chaney (July 23, 1915 – November 23, 2004) was an actress on stage, on old-time radio and on television. She was perhaps best known, however, for being "ostracized as pro-communist along with her late blacklisted husband, Ring Lardner Jr."

Early life
The daughter of Leon Lipetz, Chaney was born Fanya Lipetz on July 23, 1915, in Odessa, Russian Empire, but her family moved to Istanbul, and she began her education in an English school there. The family later moved to the United States, to the Bronx, New York City.

She attended Hunter College, but eventually dropped out to take a job at Macy's department store and gained an evening apprenticeship at Provincetown Playhouse in New York City. That led to her getting a scholarship at the Neighborhood Playhouse School of the Theatre, also in New York City, where she studied acting for two years. After finishing at the Neighborhood Playhouse School, she changed her name to Frances Chaney, thinking that producers might be more likely to hire her that way than if she used her Russian name.

Career

Radio
Chaney co-starred in House in the Country, a serial on NBC-Blue (1941-1942). She also had the role of Malvena Topper on The Adventures of Topper and played the "Burma" character on Terry and the Pirates. Additionally, she frequently appeared on Gang Busters and Mr. District Attorney.

During World War II, Chaney was active in radio programs produced by the Armed Forces Radio Service. An article about her in the November 1945 issue of Radio Romances noted: "Busy as she was, Frances frequently gave up important roles -- high-paying roles -- in order to appear on the radio shows put on by the Armed Forces Radio Service. She worked steadily on the Assignment Home series, for instance, giving that preference over any other shows."

Television
Chaney had "a recurring role that lasted 10 years on the soap opera The Edge of Night." She appeared in a pilot of Tales from the Darkside as a witch.

Stage
Chaney's Broadway credits include Golda (1977), Seidman and Son (1962) and The Lovers (1955).

Blacklisting
In their book, It Did Happen Here: Recollections of Political Repression in America, Bud Schultz and Ruth Schultz commented, "Frances Chaney Lardner's career was cut down just as she had established herself as an actress." Focusing on Chaney's experience after appearing in the "Holiday Song" episode of The Philco Television Playhouse (September 14, 1952), Judith E. Smith cited details in her book, Visions of Belonging: Family Stories, Popular Culture, and Postwar Democracy, 1940-1960:Blacklist enforcement intensified quickly between 1952 and 1953. Frances Chaney, successful radio actress and progressive ... had been cast as the cantor's unmarried niece in "Holiday Song" when it aired [on television] in September 1952. Lardner [Chaney's husband] had recently returned from jail, Chaney needed the work, and she was pleased to receive a note with her paycheck from Fred Coe saying she was now "an official member of Philco Playhouse." ... When "Holiday Song" was rebroadcast in 1953, Chaney was the only member of the original cast not rehired. ... She did not work in television again for ten years.

On November 2, 1997, James Lardner (son of Chaney and Ring Lardner Jr.) wrote an article, "The Gilding of the Blacklisted" in the Washington Post, saying about his father's blacklisting and nine-and-a-half month prison term, "Even so, he was luckier than some -- luckier than my mother, Frances Chaney, who became unemployable in radio where she had been a star (Gangbusters, Terry and the Pirates) and in movies, where she was just getting started."

Personal life
Chaney was married to David Lardner from 1941 until his death in 1944; they had a son and a daughter. A war correspondent for The New Yorker, he was killed in France soon after D-Day, when a land mine exploded under a Jeep that carried him.

On September 28, 1946, in Las Vegas, Nevada, she married his brother, Ring Lardner Jr., and they remained wed until his death in 2000; they had one son.

Death
Chaney died of Alzheimer's disease on November 23, 2004, in New York City, New York.

Filmography

References

1915 births
2004 deaths
Soviet emigrants to the United States
American radio actresses
American stage actresses
20th-century American actresses
Deaths from Alzheimer's disease
Deaths from dementia in New York (state)
21st-century American women